The National Registry of Exonerations is a project of the University of Michigan Law School, Michigan State University College of Law and the University of California Irvine Newkirk Center for Science and Society. The Registry was co-founded in 2012 with the Center on Wrongful Convictions at Northwestern University School of Law to provide detailed information about known exonerations in the United States since 1989. As of February 6, 2020, the Registry has 2,551 known exonerations in the United States since 1989. The National Registry does not include more than 1,800 defendants cleared in 15 large-scale police scandals that came to light between 1989 and March 7, 2017, in which officers systematically framed innocent defendants.

The co-founders of the Registry are Rob Warden, then the executive director of Northwestern's Center on Wrongful Convictions, and Michigan Law professor Samuel R. Gross, who with Michael Shaffer wrote the report Exonerations in the United States, 1989-2012. According to Gross, "these cases merely point to a much larger number of tragedies that we do not know about." The registry and report includes cases of defendants convicted of crimes that never occurred, cases involving false confessions, and cases involving innocent defendants who pleaded guilty. The new report reveals many more exonerations than previously found.

The National Registry of Exonerations is the largest and most detailed compilation of exoneration data ever made.

Data
Exonerations may be browsed and sorted by name of the exonerated individual, state, county, year convicted, age of the exonerated individual at the time of conviction, race of the exonerated individual, year exonerated, crime for which falsely convicted, whether DNA evidence was involved in the exoneration, and factors that contributed to the wrongful conviction. Race is the focus of a March 7, 2017, report that says,African Americans are only 13% of the American population but ... 47% of the 1,900 exonerations listed in the National Registry of Exonerations (as of October 2016), and the great majority of more than 1,800 additional innocent defendants who were framed and convicted of crimes in 15 large-scale police scandals and later cleared in "group exonerations." ... The main reason for this racial disproportion in convictions of innocent drug defendants is that police enforce drug laws more vigorously against African Americans than against members of the white majority, despite strong evidence that both groups use drugs at equivalent rates. African Americans are more frequently stopped, searched, arrested, and convicted—including in cases in which they are innocent. The extreme form of this practice is systematic racial profiling in drug-law enforcement.The registry also indicates whether a co-defendant or a person who might have been charged as a codefendant gave a confession that also implicated the exoneree and whether the false conviction case involved "shaken baby syndrome" or child sex abuse hysteria. The exoneration also includes a glossary of terms.

For all exonerations listed in the original 873 cases identified, the most common were perjury or false accusation (51%), mistaken witness identification (43%), official misconduct (i.e., by police, prosecutors, or judges), false or misleading forensic evidence (24%) and false confession (16%). Inadequate legal defense also played a role in some cases of wrongful conviction.

Perhaps more interestingly deathpenaltyinfo.org  reports 68.3% of  homicide exonerations arise from perjury or false accusation, And 68.3% of homicide accusations also arise from official misconduct.[ https://deathpenaltyinfo.org/stories/dpic-analysis-causes-of-wrongful – convictions]

The exoneration data indicates that factors contributing to false convictions vary by crime. The largest contributor to false convictions for homicide is perjury, often by someone who claims to have witnessed the crime or participated in it, and false confessions. In rape cases, the largest contributor is eyewitness misidentification, frequently by white victims who misidentify black defendants. Witness mistakes are also present in the majority of false convictions for robbery, which has few exonerations because DNA evidence is rarely available in such cases. The report also indicates that child sex abuse exonerations are almost all because it is later determined that no crime occurred.

By March 2017 the total on the Registry exceeded 2,000. A 2017 report highlighted that although African Americans form 13% of the American population, they accounted for 47% of the exonerations on the Registry. To which must be added most of the 1,800 additional innocent defendants who were framed and convicted of crimes in 15 large-scale police scandals and later cleared in "group exonerations".

Potential victims of injustice 

In 2014 a study involving the Registry found that 4% of those sentenced to death in the US turned out to be innocent. This 4% error rate has been extrapolated by commentators to the 2.2 million people in prison in the United States, giving them a figure of 88,000 innocent people behind bars, few of which have access to attorneys and innocence projects to appeal their cases.

See also
Actual innocence
Eyewitness memory
Innocence Project
List of exonerated death row inmates
List of wrongful convictions in the United States
Misinformation effect
Mistaken identity

Notes

External links
Official website
Official Twitter feed
Exoneration List Shows Patterns In False Convictions, May 22, 2012 interview on NPR's All Things Considered with Professor Samuel R. Gross and Audie Cornish

2012 introductions
Criminal procedure
Online law databases
Overturned convictions in the United States
Databases in the United States
Wrongful conviction advocacy